Rarities Vol. 2: The Originals is a compilation album by the American punk rock band No Use for a Name, released February 12, 2021 through Fat Wreck Chords. A sequel to 2017's Rarities Vol. I: The Covers, it consists of demos and early versions of songs that were later recorded for the band's studio albums (including seven previously unreleased demos for their 2002 album Hard Rock Bottom), as well as tracks that appeared on 7-inches and compilation albums.

Track listing 
Credits adapted from the album's liner notes.

Personnel 
Credits adapted from the album's liner notes.
 Tony Sly – vocals, guitar
 Chris Shiflett – guitar (tracks 1, 7, 8)
 Dave Nassie – guitar (tracks 2, 4–6, 9–15)
 Ed Gregor – guitar (track 3)
 Matt Riddle – bass, vocals (tracks 1, 2, 4–15)
 Steve Papoutsis – bass (track 3)
 Rory Koff – drums
 Compiled by Fat Mike and Chad Williams
 Justin Weis – mastering
 Sergie Loobkoff – artwork, layout

References 

No Use for a Name albums
Fat Wreck Chords compilation albums
2021 compilation albums